Suad Gruda (born 27 July 1991) is a Swedish and Montenegrin retired footballer who last played for Nyköpings BIS as a midfielder.

Club career 
Gruda was born in Macedonia but his family relocated to Sweden and Luleå the year after his birth. There he spent his youth years at IFK Luleå before moving to Degerfors IF and then Allsvenskan club Gefle IF in 2010 after having spent a year playing first team football with his original club. After leaving Gefle two years later he played for second tier JIPPO in Finland before signing with Nyköpings BIS in March 2013. On August 11, 2013, Gruda left Nyköpings BIS for Umeå FC, but returned to his old club the next season.

In November 2019, he retired from playing, citing persistent knee problems.

International career
Gruda represented the Montenegro national under-21 football team during one game against Andorra in the 2013 UEFA European Under-21 Football Championship qualification.

References

External links 
 Profile at Eliteprospects
 Profile at Nyköpings BIS official website

1991 births
Living people
Macedonian people of Montenegrin descent
Association football midfielders
Montenegrin footballers
Montenegro under-21 international footballers
IFK Luleå players
Gefle IF players
JIPPO players
Nyköpings BIS players
Umeå FC players
Allsvenskan players
Ykkönen players
Ettan Fotboll players
Montenegrin expatriate footballers
Expatriate footballers in Sweden
Montenegrin expatriate sportspeople in Sweden
Expatriate footballers in Finland
Montenegrin expatriate sportspeople in Finland